Arnakija is a village in the municipality of Saraj, North Macedonia.

Demographics
According to the 2021 census, the village had a total of 1.163 inhabitants. Ethnic groups in the village include:

Albanians  1.086
Macedonians 5
Others 71

References

External links

Villages in Saraj Municipality
Albanian communities in North Macedonia